E. C. Coleman Jr. (born September 25, 1950) is a retired American basketball player.

Born in Flora, Mississippi, Coleman played collegiately for Houston Baptist, and was selected by the Houston Rockets in the 3rd round (51st pick overall) of the 1973 NBA draft.  In the NBA, Coleman played for the Rockets (1973–74, 1978–79), New Orleans Jazz (1974–77) and Golden State Warriors (1977–78) in the NBA for a total of 357 games.

Coleman was named to the 1st NBA All-Defensive Team in 1976–77 and to the 2nd NBA All-Defensive Team in 1977–78.

External links

1950 births
Living people
African-American basketball players
Basketball players from Mississippi
Golden State Warriors players
Houston Christian Huskies men's basketball players
Houston Rockets draft picks
Houston Rockets players
New Orleans Jazz expansion draft picks
New Orleans Jazz players
People from Flora, Mississippi
American men's basketball players
Power forwards (basketball)
21st-century African-American people
20th-century African-American sportspeople